The following highways are numbered 599:

Canada
  Alberta Highway 599
  Ontario Highway 599

Ireland
  R599

United Kingdom

United States
  Florida State Road 599 – hidden designation for a portion of U.S. Route 41 in and near Tampa
  Kentucky Route 599
  Nevada State Route 599
  New Mexico State Road 599
  Puerto Rico Highway 599
  Texas Farm to Market Road 599
  Washington State Route 599